This is a list of historically Jewish fraternities and sororities in the United States and Canada. These organizations exemplify (or exemplified) a range of "Jewishness"; some are historically Jewish in origin but later became strictly secular. Some remain more celebratory of their Jewish roots from a historic perspective only, and some actively promote Jewish culture and religious traditions within their current program.

The terms "fraternity" and "sorority" are used somewhat interchangeably, with men's and co-ed groups always using "fraternity", and women's groups using either "fraternity" or "sorority".  For convenience, the term "Greek letter society" is a generic substitute. The word "Greek" in this case refers to the use of Greek letters for each society's name, and not to Greek ethnicity.

Collegiate
The following list include the larger groups. There were many Jewish local chapters formed at universities around the United States, most of which eventually became a chapter of these larger entities. Bold indicates active groups. Italic indicates dormant groups, or those which merged into another, larger society.

Social fraternities

Notes

Social sororities

Professional 
Information on the continuing activity of some of these societies may be missing. Active groups are listed in bold. Inactive groups are listed in italic.

Notes

High school 
Information on the continuing activity of some of these societies may be missing. Known active groups are listed in bold; dormant groups are listed in italics.

Notes

See also
 List of Jewish universities and colleges in the United States
 Defunct North American collegiate sororities
 List of social fraternities and sororities
 Cultural interest fraternities and sororities

References

 
Jewish
Jewish